Lewis Crocker (born 6 January 1997) is a Northern Irish professional boxer who has held the WBO European welterweight title since 2020.

Amateur career

Amateur boxing in both the Republic of Ireland and Northern Ireland is governed by the Irish Amateur Boxing Association. As an amateur, Crocker fought out of the Cairn Lodge Boxing Club in Belfast before eventually moving to Holy Trinity in the west of the city. His first major honour came in July 2011, when he represented Ireland in the European Schoolboy Championships. He earned a bronze medal for his efforts. Overall, Lewis had 97 amateur bouts, winning 90. On the way, he won seven All-Ireland junior titles. He also represented Ireland at the European Youth Championships in Sofia, Bulgaria in 2012 as well as the World Junior Championships in Kyiv, Ukraine in 2013. According to Irish Boxing, he holds the record for the quickest knockout in Irish amateur boxing history at under 12 seconds. He won the 2015 Irish Boxing KO of the year for this effort. In 2018, Lewis won a settlement over the Ulster Boxing Council (UBC). The UBC did not select Lewis to represent Ireland in the 2015 Commonwealth Youth Games despite a recommendation by the Irish Amateur Boxing Association's head coach for Ulster. Lewis believed he was not picked for the NI Commonwealth Youth Games squad because of his Protestant background or perceived unionist political opinions.

Professional career
Crocker made his professional debut on 10 March 2017, scoring a first-round technical knockout (TKO) victory over Ferenc Jarko at the Waterfront Hall in Belfast.

Professional boxing record

References

External links 

Living people
1997 births
Male boxers from Northern Ireland
Boxers from Belfast
Welterweight boxers